Pitcairnia subg. Pepinia is a subgenus of plants in the family Bromeliaceae. It has at times been treated as the separate genus Pepinia, but is now included again in the genus Pitcairnia. The name is for Pierre Denis Pépin, French member of the Imperial and Central Society of Agriculture (c.1802-1876).

Taxonomy
Pepinia was established as a genus in 1870 by Adolphe-Théodore Brongniart in a publication by Édouard André. Pepinia was reduced to a subgenus of Pitcairnia in 1881 by John Gilbert Baker, but elevated again to a genus in 1988, largely on the basis of the morphology of its seeds. The use of morphological characters to differentiate Pepinia from Pitcairnia was rejected in 1999; a view later confirmed by multiple molecular studies.

Selected species
Species that have been placed in Pepinia and are now placed in Pitcairnia subg. Pepinia include:
Pepinia agavifolia (L.B.Sm.) G.S.Varad. & Gilmartin = Pitcairnia agavifolia
Pepinia alborubra (Baker) G.S.Varad. & Gilmartin = Pitcairnia alborubra
Pepinia alexanderi H.Luther = Pitcairnia alexanderi
Pepinia amblyosperma (L.B.Sm.) G.S.Varad. & Gilmartin = Pitcairnia amblyosperma
Pepinia aphelandriflora (Lemaire) André = Pitcairnia aphelandriflora
Pepinia armata (Maury) G.S.Varad. & Gilmartin = Pitcairnia armata
Pepinia beachiae (J. Utley & Burt-Utley) H.Luther = Pitcairnia beachiae
Pepinia bulbosa (L.B.Sm.) G.S.Varad. & Gilmartin = Pitcairnia bulbosa
Pepinia caricifolia (Martius ex Schultes f.) G.S.Varad. & Gilmartin = Pitcairnia caricifolia
Pepinia carnososepala (Rauh & E. Gross) H.Luther = Pitcairnia carnososepala
Pepinia corallina (Linden & André) G.S.Varad. & Gilmartin = Pitcairnia corallina
Pepinia ctenophylla (L.B.Sm.) G.S.Varad. & Gilmartin = Pitcairnia ctenophylla
Pepinia cuatrecasasiana (L.B.Sm.) G.S.Varad. & Gilmartin = Pitcairnia cuatrecasasiana
Pepinia epiphytica (L.B.Sm.) G.S.Varad. & Gilmartin = Pitcairnia epiphytica
Pepinia filispina (L.B.Sm.) G.S.Varad. & Gilmartin = Pitcairnia filispina
Pepinia fulgens H.Luther = Pitcairnia harrylutheri
Pepinia harlingii (L.B.Sm.) G.S.Varad. & Gilmartin = Pitcairnia harlingii
Pepinia hooveri H.Luther = Pitcairnia hooveri
Pepinia juncoides (L.B.Sm.) G.S.Varad. & Gilmartin = Pitcairnia juncoides
Pepinia kunhardtiana (L.B.Sm.) G.S.Varad. & Gilmartin = Pitcairnia kunhardtiana
Pepinia leopoldii W.Till & S.Till = Pitcairnia leopoldii
Pepinia maguirei (L.B.Sm.) G.S.Varad. & Gilmartin = Pitcairnia maguirei
Pepinia patentiflora (L.B.Sm.) G.S.Varad. & Gilmartin = Pitcairnia patentiflora
Pepinia pruinosa Kunth = Pitcairnia pruinosa
Pepinia punicea (Scheidweiler) Brongniart ex André = Pitcairnia punicea
Pepinia rubiginosa (Baker) G.S.Varad. & Gilmartin = Pitcairnia rubiginosa
Pepinia sanguinea H.Luther = Pitcairnia sanguinea
Pepinia turbinella (L.B.Sm.) G.S.Varad. & Gilmartin = Pitcairnia turbinella
Pepinia uaupensis (Baker) G.S.Varad. & Gilmartin = Pitcairnia uaupensis
Pepinia verrucosa E. Gross = Pitcairnia elvirae

References

External links
BSI Genera Gallery photos

Pitcairnia
Plant subgenera